Edward Stanley "Eddie" Prokop (February 11, 1922 – May 30, 1955) was an American football player.  He played college football at the Georgia Institute of Technology and in the National Football League in the 1940s.  He was the first pick (4th overall) in the 1945 NFL Draft for the Boston Yanks.

College career 
Prokop played college football at Georgia Tech under coach William Alexander and was a 1969 Hall of Fame inductee there. In the 1944 Sugar Bowl Prokop led his #13 Yellow Jackets to 20–18 victory over #15 ranked Tulsa.  In that game he rushed for 199 yards, threw a touchdown and kicked two extra points. The Sugar Bowl did not award a game MVP until 1948.

NFL career
Prokop was the fourth overall pick of the 1945 NFL Draft, selected by the Boston Yanks, and played for them in the 1946 and 1947 seasons. He played for the Chicago Rockets in the All-America Football Conference (AAFC) in 1948, and then returned to the Yanks, who became the New York Bulldogs in 1949, his final season as a professional.

After football
After his playing days, Prokop was a sales engineer for National Solvent Corp. in Cleveland.

Death
At age 33 in 1955, Prokop suffered a cerebral hemorrhage, originally thought to be heat exhaustion, at his Cleveland home. He died later that day at Huron Road Hospital.

Personal life
Prokop's brother Joe also played in the AAFC.

See also 

 List of Georgia Tech Yellow Jackets starting quarterbacks

References

External links
 
 Baylor School – Eddie Prokop '41

1922 births
1955 deaths
Boston Yanks players
Chicago Rockets players
Georgia Tech Yellow Jackets football players
Players of American football from Cleveland